The couesnophone, also known as the goofus or queenophone, is a free-reed musical instrument resembling a saxophone harmonicor. Its reeds vibrate when the desired keys are activated and the player blows through a tube. "Best described as a mouth-blown accordion," "it sounded like a cross between a harmonica and an accordion." French manufacturer Couesnon was awarded patent no. 569294 in 1924 for an instrument that was described as a saxophone jouet (fr. "toy saxophone"). However, the couesnophone is a polyphonic instrument, while the saxophone is monophonic.

Play
The couesnophone's keys are set in a keyboard with a layout similar to that of the Hohner early  melodicas, in  parallel rows corresponding to the white and black keys of a piano. Its rubber mouthpiece allows the horn be held and played vertically like a saxophone or horizontally like a melodica.

Performers
The couesnophone was introduced into jazz and America by bass saxophonist and vibraphonist Adrian Rollini, though he is sometimes credited with its invention. The term "goofus" might have been coined by jazz musicians such as Rollini, or Ed Kirkeby, because it is easier to pronounce.

Recordings with Rollini on goofus include The Little Ramblers' "Deep Elm"; The Goofus Five's "Everybody Love My Baby" and "Oh! How I Love My Darling"; the Varsity Eight's "How I Love That Girl", "Doo Wacka Doo", "Oh! Mabel", "Happy (Watchin' All the Clouds Roll By)", "Ain't My Baby Grand?", and "I Ain't Got Nobody to Love"; and Joe Venuti and the Eddie Lang Blue Five's "Raggin' the Scale". Don Redman played the goofus on "You'll Never Get to Heaven With Those Eyes", "A New Kind of Man (With a New Kind of Love for Me)", and "Cold Mammas (Burn Me Up)".

References

Further reading
 Berindei, Mihai (1976). Jazz Dictionary, Scientific and Encyclopaedic Press, Bucharest, p. 110. 
 Missin, P (2004). Couesnophone or "goofus"
 Rollini, Adrian (March, 1928). "The Goofus and How to Play It", Melody Maker.
 "liner notes of The Goofus Five 1926 to 1927 on Timeless Records", RedHotJazz.com.

Free reed aerophones
Saxophones
1924 musical instruments
Toy instruments and noisemakers